Ella Georgiyevna Adayevskaya (Ella Adaïewsky; ; 26 July 1926) was a Russian-German composer, pianist, and ethnomusicologist.

Adayevskaya wrote vocal music (including choral works), chamber music, and two operas. She also edited a collection of Italian songs and published writings on folk music and the music of ancient Greece.

Life
Born in St. Petersburg on 22 February 1846 as Elizaveta/Elisabeth von Schultz, as the daughter of the prominent Estophile of Baltic German heritage Georg Julius von Schultz. Adayevskaya began learning the piano in childhood. Amongst her teachers were Adolf von Henselt, Anton Rubinstein, and Alexander Dreyschock. She studied composition with Alexander Famintsyn and Nikolai Zaremba. Adayevskaya was a pseudonym derived from the notes A, D, and A, played by the kettledrum in Mikhail Glinka's opera Ruslan and Ludmila.

Her earliest works include choruses written for the Russian Imperial Chapel Choir.  In the 1870s, she wrote two operas. The first, titled Neprigozhaya (The Ugly Girl) (in the composer's German manuscript Salomonida, die Tochter des Bojaren, Salomonida, The Boyar's Daughter), was a one-act piece written in 1873.  The more ambitious Zarya (Dawn, German title Die Morgenröte der Freiheit (The Dawn of Freedom) ) followed in 1877; this four-act work was dedicated by the composer to Tsar Alexander II, but was rejected by the censor. Later, she embarked on several solo concert tours of Europe and settled in Venice in 1882.  In 1881, she composed her Greek Sonata for clarinet or violin and piano. In Italy, she collected national songs, among others songs of the people of the Raetia region in quintuple metre.

In 1911, she moved to Neuwied where was associated with the circle of the poet Carmen Sylva and published many articles on folk music.

Adayevskaya died in Bonn in 1926.  She was buried in the Alter Friedhof, Bonn.

Works

Operas
Neprigozhaya (The Ugly Girl), 1873
Zarya svobody (The Dawn of Freedom), 1877

Vocal music
Yolka (The Fir Tree), cantata, c. 1870; also
other choral works, songs

Chamber music
Greek Sonata for clarinet and piano, 1881
piano pieces

Notes

References
Brown, Malcolm Hamrick (n.d.). "Adayevskaya [née Schultz], Ella Georgiyevna." in Oxford Music Online, accessed 22 January 2016. 
Eaglefield-Hull, A. (1924). A Dictionary of Modern Music and Musicians London: Dent. 
Hüsken, Renate (2005). Ella Adaïewsky (1846-1926): Pianistin – Komponistin – Musikwissenschaftlerin. Cologne: Dohr. .
Schultz-Adaïewsky E. Morgenröte der Freiheit. Volksoper in vier Akten. Klavierauszug. Nach dem Autograf bearbeitet und herausgegeben von Denis Lomtev. – Lage (Westf.): BMV Robert Burau, 2015.

External links

Biographer Renate Hüsken's website on Adaïewsky 

1846 births
1926 deaths
19th-century classical composers
20th-century classical composers
Pupils of Adolf Henselt
Pupils of Nikolai Zaremba
Russian Romantic composers
Russian women classical composers
Russian classical pianists
Russian women pianists
Russian musicologists
Women musicologists
Women classical composers
19th-century classical pianists
Women classical pianists
20th-century women composers
19th-century women composers
Russian people of German descent
Russian expatriates in Germany
19th-century women pianists
20th-century women pianists
19th-century musicologists